Turaida Castle (meaning Thor's garden in Livonian) is a recently reconstructed medieval castle in Turaida, in the Vidzeme region of Latvia, on the opposite bank of the Gauja River from Kurzeme.

History
Turaida castle dominates the Museum Reserve and is visually its most impressive element. When seen from the air, or the opposite bank of the river Gauja in Sigulda, Turaida castle can be seen rising above the treeline. From this view, the forepart of the castle is formed by the northern forecastle's gate tower.  The main tower which is the highest is situated centrally, and the rear view forms the southern forecastle with its tower shaped southern section.

Construction of the castle was started in 1214 upon directions given by Albert, Archbishop of Riga to his Livonian Brothers of the Sword (soon to merge with the Teutonic Order) at the place where the wooden castle of Livonians had previously stood. A castellum type fortress was built and named Fredeland, which translates as 'Land of Peace,' but became better known locally by the Livonian name of 'Turaida,' which has survived until the present day. The castle was constructed largely in the classic red-brick construction of the Baltic crusading orders. Improving the castle's defensive system continued in later centuries, and in the 14th century, the tower shaped southern section was built; at the beginning of the 15th century, when firearms were invented, the semi rounded western tower was built. Domestic buildings and living accommodation were also erected in the inner yard of the castle. Minor reconstruction work was carried out in 17th century although the castle started to lose its strategic importance. After a fire in 1776 it was abandoned and gradually became ruinous.

By the beginning of the 20th century, only separate fragments of the defensive wall and some buildings – the main tower, semi-rounded tower and the western section – were left. From 1976 regular archaeological excavations were carried out which were followed by restoration and conservation works revealing the castle's earlier state. Exhibitions about the history of the brick castle and the Gauja Livonians are available in the restored buildings. From the viewing place of the main tower it is possible to see the unique landscape of the picturesque Gauja valley and the territory of the Turaida Museum Reserve.

See also
 Krimulda Castle
 Sigulda Castle
 Sigulda Medieval Castle

References

External links

 Turaida website 
 Turaida Museum Reserve
 Turaida and Sigulda: InYourPocket Guide website
 The Association of Castles and Museums around the Baltic Sea

Buildings and structures completed in 1214
Castles in Latvia
Brick Gothic
Gothic architecture in Latvia
Castles of the Teutonic Knights